Ritual is the fifth studio album by American melodic death metal band The Black Dahlia Murder. It was released on June 17 in Europe and on June 21 in North America via Metal Blade Records. It is the band's last record to feature Ryan "Bart" Williams on bass and Shannon Lucas on drums. The album sold 12,960 copies in the United States in its first week of release and debuted at No. 31 on the Billboard 200.  The album has sold 51,000 copies in the US .

Production and recording
The album was once again produced by Mark Lewis, who also worked on the band's 2009 album Deflorate. Frontman Trevor Strnad considers Ritual "the most focused Black Dahlia Murder strike of all time."

"The whole thread of the songs is more tied together than ever before," explains Strnad. "Part of it was kind of like, 'What can we do that's the most Black Dahlia Murder thing? What's going to be the most quintessential Black Dahlia Murder thing we can do?' That's kind of what we set our foothold in. And 'Ritual', it just lends itself to that — it's mysticism and magic and all of that. Everyone has an association with some kind of ritual, so we just thought it was the next logical step."

Recalling the writing process that led to Rituals eventual twelve songs, Strnad says that "every song that got brought forth was exciting and more three-dimensional, more twists and turns, more surprises. There's more ups and downs and taking people on a journey this time."

Co-founder Brian Eschbach, meanwhile, credits the presence of fellow guitarist Ryan Knight, who joined the band during Deflorate, with helping to move things forward on this particular venture.
"It's been more collaborative than it's been in years," Eschbach notes. "The last two albums (Deflorate and 2007's Nocturnal) I wrote most of the music, and this one it's almost a 50-50 effort between me and (Knight). He lifted what we were doing on the last album so much from what we've done before, his different techniques and stylings that he knows how to wield. It's really exciting for us to have that be part of the band now." Strnad adds that Knight "is an educated musician, and he's brought that kind of aspect into the band, too. We came to him having higher expectations, and he's exceeded all of those [...] And I would say this time, with 'Ritual', we really nailed it even harder than we have before."

The first lyrics in the first track, "A Shrine to Madness", are a reference to a quote which appeared in the 1997 video game Castlevania: Symphony of the Night.

Promotion and release
The song "Moonlight Equilibrium" was made available for streaming on April 29, 2011 at Metal Blade's web site. The song "Conspiring with the Damned" became available for streaming on May 17, 2011 via lambgoat.com. Audio samples of all the tracks that are set to appear on "Ritual" were available for streaming at Amazon.com the 7th May. The entire album was made available for public streaming on June 14, 2011 on MSN. The album was released on June 17 in Europe and on June 21 in North America via Metal Blade Records.

Track listing

Personnel

The Black Dahlia Murder
 Trevor Strnad – lead vocals
 Brian Eschbach – rhythm guitar, backing vocals
 Ryan Knight – lead guitar
 Ryan "Bart" Williams – bass
 Shannon Lucas – drums

Additional personnel
 Jannina Norpoth and John-Paul Norpoth - strings
 Eric Hoegemeyer - piano on "Carbonized in Cruciform"

Production
 Jason Suecof – production, engineering, mixing
 Mark Lewis – production, engineering, mixing
 Alan Douches – mastering
 Jean-Emmanuel "Valnoir" Simoulin – artwork, design, photography
 Brian Slagel – executive producer

References

2011 albums
The Black Dahlia Murder (band) albums
Metal Blade Records albums
Albums produced by Jason Suecof
Albums produced by Mark Lewis (music producer)